The Assumption Altarpiece was a 1529-1530 multi-panel painting by Moretto da Brescia. It is mainly oil on panel, although the two angels on the cornice are in tempera grassa verniciata.

The whole work was originally in the Basilica of Santa Maria degli Angeli in Gardone Val Trompia but was split up in 1805 and moved to the Pinacoteca di Brera in Milan. All the panels remained there until 1812, when the two lower side panels (St Bonaventure and St Anthony of Padua and St Bernardino of Siena and St Louis of Toulouse) and three other paintings (one each by Boltraffio, Marco d'Oggiono and Carpaccio) were given to the Louvre in exchange for two paintings by Van Dyck and one each by Rubens, Jordaens and Rembrandt.

Panels

Cornice
Two Angels

Upper register
Saint Jerome and St Paul
Assumption of the Virgin
St Catherine of Alexandria and St Clare of Assisi

Lower register
St Bonaventure and St Anthony of Padua
St Francis of Assisi
St Bernardino of Siena and St Louis of Toulouse

References

Bibliography (in Italian)
Camillo Boselli, Il Moretto, 1498-1554, in "Commentari dell'Ateneo di Brescia per l'anno 1954 - Supplemento", Brescia 1954
Pietro Da Ponte, L'opera del Moretto, Brescia 1898
Luigi Falsina, Gemme artistiche triumpline, in "La valle Trompia", anno 7, Brescia 1930
György Gombosi, Moretto da Brescia, Basel 1943
Valerio Guazzoni, Moretto. Il tema sacro, Brescia 1981
Pier Virgilio Begni Redona, Alessandro Bonvicino - Il Moretto da Brescia, Editrice La Scuola, Brescia 1988
Adolfo Venturi, Storia dell'arte italiana, volume IX, La pittura del Cinquecento, Milano 1929

Paintings by Moretto da Brescia
Paintings of the Assumption of the Virgin
Paintings of Francis of Assisi
Paintings depicting Paul the Apostle
Paintings of Catherine of Alexandria
Paintings of Saint Bonaventure
Paintings of Louis of Toulouse
Paintings of Jerome
Paintings of Anthony of Padua
Paintings of Clare of Assisi
Paintings of Bernardino of Siena
Paintings in the Louvre by Italian artists
Paintings in the collection of the Pinacoteca di Brera
1530 paintings
Altarpieces
Angels in art